Weird Woman is a 1944 Inner Sanctum film noir mystery and horror film directed by Reginald Le Borg and starring Lon Chaney Jr., Anne Gwynne, and Evelyn Ankers. The "Inner Sanctum" franchise originated with a popular radio series and all of the films star Chaney Jr. The film is one of several films based on the novel Conjure Wife by Fritz Leiber, the others including Night of the Eagle (1962) and Witches' Brew (1980). Co-star Evelyn Ankers had previously worked with Chaney in Ghost of Frankenstein, where Chaney played the Frankenstein monster, and The Wolf Man, where Chaney played the titular role.

Plot
Professor Norman Reed falls in love with and marries a woman named Paula while on vacation in the South Seas. When they return to his hometown, she is greeted coolly by much of the community, especially Ilona, who felt that Reed was hers. Strange things begin to happen, including the death of a colleague, which turns people against her even more, especially as she believes in voodoo and other supernatural phenomena. Reed must work hard to prove her innocence and find the real culprit behind the strange doings.

Cast
Lon Chaney, Jr. as Prof. Norman Reed (billed as Lon Chaney)
Anne Gwynne as Paula Clayton Reed
Evelyn Ankers as Ilona Carr
Ralph Morgan as Prof. Millard Sawtelle
Elisabeth Risdon as Dean of Women Grace Gunnison
Lois Collier as Margret Mercer
Harry Hayden as Dean Septimus Carr
Elizabeth Russell as Evelyn Sawtelle
Phil Brown as David Jennings
 Kay Harding as Student (billed as Jackie Lou Harding)

Production 
Director Reginald LeBorg recalls being given the script on a Friday and being told to begin shooting a week from Monday; the cast was filled out shortly before filming. This rushed production schedule was the norm at Universal. Inner Sanctum films cost approximately $150,000 to produce, and shooting schedules were routinely 12 days.

Actress Evelyn Ankers would later say that she found playing a villainess rather difficult. When LeBorg would say "action" and Ankers would try to exact a menacing look, she and co-star Anne Gwynne would almost inevitably start laughing. Universal never hired her to play a villain again.

References

External links 

 
 
 
 
Weird Woman at Trailers from Hell

1944 films
American horror films
American black-and-white films
1940s fantasy films
1944 horror films
Universal Pictures films
Films based on radio series
Films directed by Reginald Le Borg
American fantasy films
Films scored by Paul Sawtell
1940s English-language films
1940s American films